Requiem is a 1982 Hungarian drama film directed by Zoltán Fábri. It was entered into the 32nd Berlin International Film Festival, where it won the Silver Bear for an outstanding single achievement.

Cast
 Edit Frajt - Netti (Hungarian dubbing: Nóra Káldi)
 Lajos Balázsovits - Hannover István
 László Gálffi - Pelle Gyula
 György Kálmán - Ágoston doktor
 László György - Cellatárs
 György Miklósy - Head Waiter (as György Miklósi)
 Antal Konrád - Német katona
 Mátyás Usztics - Szabadult fogoly
 József Fonyó - ÁVH-s
 János Kovács - Rendõr az õrszobán
 Teréz Várhegyi - hair-dresser
 András Ambrus - policeman
 Imre Surányi - Nagy XII., policeman
 Flóra Kádár – pedicurist

References

External links

1982 films
1980s Hungarian-language films
1982 drama films
Films directed by Zoltán Fábri
Hungarian drama films